Narendra Singh Yadav (born 7 July 1950) is an Indian politician, statesman and Philanthropist from Uttar Pradesh. Mr. Yadav is the son of Indian Politician and Statesman Mr. Rajendra Singh Yadav, a former minister and seven times MLA from Shamshabad and Mohammadabad assembly constituency in the Farrukhabad District. Mr. Narendra Singh Yadav is himself a six time MLA and former minister. He was first Minister in Mulayam Singh Yadav's Government in 1996 and also in the tenure of Akhilesh Yadav's government in 2012. Mr. Yadav was first elected as a Member of Legislative Assembly in 1985 Uttar Pradesh Assembly Elections from Indian National Congress defeating opposition candidate by a record margin of 61,950 votes. In that election he got 71,267 votes and his closest opposition candidate Kunwar Amarjeet Singh managed to secure only 9,317 votes. In 1989 UP Assembly Elections he was defeated by a Janta Dal Party candidate Mr. Suresh Chander Singh Yadav by a close margin of 404 votes. After the formation of Samajwadi Party, due to his close relation with Mulayam Singh Yadav, Mr. Yadav joined Samajwadi Party and was subsequently elected as a MLA in 1991, 1996, 1997, 2002 and 2012 from Mohammadabad and Amritpur constituency. Mr. Yadav was sacked as a minister from the UP Government in 2014 when his son Sachin Singh Yadav contested as an independent candidate from Farrukhabad Lok Sabha Constituency, opposing Samajwadi Party candidate. Narendra Singh Yadav is currently affiliated to Samajwadi Party.

Education

Mr. Yadav is a graduate in L.L.B. from Lucknow University.

References 

1950 births
Living people
Samajwadi Party politicians